The 2023 TCU Horned Frogs baseball team represents Texas Christian University during the 2023 NCAA Division I baseball season. The Horned Frogs play their home games at Lupton Stadium as a member of the Big 12 Conference. They are led by head coach Kirk Saarloos, in his second year as head coach and eleventh season at TCU.

Previous season
The 2022 TCU Horned Frogs baseball team notched a 38-22 (16–8) record.  They won the Big 12 regular season championship and advanced to the regionals of the 2022 NCAA Tournament.

Personnel

Coaching staff

Schedule and results

|-
! style="" | Regular Season (7–5)
|- valign="top" 

|- bgcolor="#bbffbb"
| Feb 17 || 3:00 pm || FloSports || vs. No. 10 Vanderbilt* || No. 15 || Globe Life FieldArlington, TX || W11–4 || Savage(1–0) || Hliboki(0–1) || — || 15,721 || 1–0 || — || StatsStory
|- bgcolor="#bbffbb"
| Feb 18 || 7:00 pm || FloSports || vs. No. 8 Arkansas* || No. 15 || Globe Life FieldArlington, TX || W18–6 || Klecker(1–0) || Morris(0–1) || — || 20,295 || 2–0 || — || StatsStory
|- bgcolor="#ffbbbb"
| Feb 19 || 6:30 pm || FloSports || vs. Missouri* || No. 15 || Globe Life FieldArlington, TX || L8–9(10) || Franklin(1–0) || Wright(0–1) || — || 16,100 || 2-1 || — || StatsStory
|- bgcolor="#bbffbb"
| Feb 22 || 6:00 pm ||  || UT Arlington* || No. 8 || Lupton StadiumFort Worth, TX || W7–3 || Rodriguez(1–0) || Brooks(0–1) || — || 3,897 || 3-1 || — || StatsStory
|- bgcolor="#ffbbbb"
| Feb 24 || 6:30 pm || ESPN+ || vs. Florida State* || No. 8 || Lupton StadiumFort Worth, TX || L1–10 || Baumeister(1–0) || Vanderhei(0–1) || Crowell(1) || 4,902 || 3-2 || — || StatsStory
|- bgcolor="#ffbbbb"
| Feb 25 || 2:00 pm || ESPN+ || vs. Florida State* || No. 8 || Lupton StadiumFort Worth, TX || L8–10 || Whittaker(2–0) || Savage(0–1)  || Armstrong(1) || 4,090 || 3-3 || — || StatsStory
|- bgcolor="#bbffbb"
| Feb 26 || 1:00 pm || ESPN+ || vs. Florida State* || No. 8 || Lupton StadiumFort Worth, TX || W3–2 || Klecker(2–0) || Armstrong(0–1)  || — || 4,176 || 4-3 || — || StatsStory
|- bgcolor="#bbffbb"
| Feb 28 || 6:30 pm ||  || at Dallas Baptist* || No. 10 || Horner BallparkDallas, TX || W4–1(12) || Abeldt(1–0) || Russell(0–1) || Feser(1) || 1,737 || 5-3 || — || StatsStory
|-

|- bgcolor="#bbffbb"
| Mar 3 || 3:00 pm || AT&T SportsNet || vs. Michigan* || No. 10 || Minute Maid ParkHouston, TX || W6–0 || Vanderhei(1–1) || O'Halloran(2–1) || Savage(1) || 1,250  || 6-3 || — || StatsStory
|- bgcolor="#ffbbbb"
| Mar 4 || 3:00 pm || AT&T SportsNet || vs. No. 14 Louisville* || No. 10 || Minute Maid ParkHouston, TX || L2–3 || Farone(1–0) || Klecker(2–1) || Kuehner(1) ||  || 6-4 || — ||  StatsStory
|- bgcolor="#bbffbb"
| Mar 5 || 3:00 pm || AT&T SportsNet || vs. Rice* || No. 10 || Minute Maid ParkHouston, TX || W7-0 || Brown(1–0) || Vincent(1–1) || — ||  || 7-4 || — || StatsStory
|- bgcolor="#ffbbbb"
| Mar 7 || 6:00 pm || ESPN+ || vs. UT Arlington* || No. 10 || Lupton StadiumFort Worth, TX || L7–8 || Gray(1–0) || Sloan(0–1) || Peters(4) || 3,832 || 7-5 || — || StatsStory  
|- bgcolor=
| Mar 10 || 6:30 pm || ESPN+ || vs. San Diego* || No. 10 || Lupton StadiumFort Worth, TX ||  ||  ||  ||  ||  ||  || — || 
|- bgcolor=
| Mar 11 || 2:00 pm || ESPN+ || vs. San Diego* || No. 10 || Lupton StadiumFort Worth, TX ||  ||  ||  ||  ||  ||  || — || 
|- bgcolor=
| Mar 12 || 1:00 pm || ESPN+ || vs. San Diego* || No. 10 || Lupton StadiumFort Worth, TX ||  ||  ||  ||  ||  ||  || — || 
|- bgcolor=
| Mar 14 || 6:00 pm || ESPN+ || at Texas State* ||  || Bobcat BallparkSan Marcos, TX ||  ||  ||  ||  ||  ||  || — || 
|- bgcolor=
| Mar 17 || 6:00 pm || || at Oklahoma ||  || L. Dale Mitchell Baseball ParkNorman, OK ||  ||  ||  ||  ||  ||  ||  || 
|- bgcolor=
| Mar 18 || 4:00 pm || || at Oklahoma ||  || L. Dale Mitchell Baseball ParkNorman, OK ||  ||  ||  ||  ||  ||  ||  || 
|- bgcolor=
| Mar 19 || 2:00 pm || || at Oklahoma ||  || L. Dale Mitchell Baseball ParkNorman, OK ||  ||  ||  ||  ||  ||  ||  || 
|- bgcolor=
| Mar 21 || 6:00 pm || ESPN+ || vs. Abilene Christian* ||  || Lupton StadiumFort Worth, TX ||  ||  ||  ||  ||  ||  || — || 
|- bgcolor=
| Mar 22 || 6:00 pm || ESPN+ || vs. Northwestern* ||  || Lupton StadiumFort Worth, TX ||  ||  ||  ||  ||  ||  || — || 
|- bgcolor=
| Mar 24 || 6:30 pm || ESPN+ || vs. Kansas ||  || Lupton StadiumFort Worth, TX ||  ||  ||  ||  ||  ||  ||  || 
|- bgcolor=
| Mar 25 || 2:00 pm || ESPN+ || vs. Kansas ||  || Lupton StadiumFort Worth, TX ||  ||  ||  ||  ||  ||  ||  || 
|- bgcolor=
| Mar 26 || 1:00 pm || ESPN+ || vs. Kansas ||  || Lupton StadiumFort Worth, TX ||  ||  ||  ||  ||  ||  ||  || 
|- bgcolor=
| Mar 28 || 6:30 pm || ESPN+ || at UT Arlington* ||  || Clay Gould BallparkArlington, TX ||  ||  ||  ||  ||  ||  || — || 
|- bgcolor=
| Mar 31 || 6:30 pm || ESPN+ || at Texas Tech ||  || Dan Law FieldLubbock, TX ||  ||  ||  ||  ||  ||  ||  || 
|-

|- bgcolor=
| Apr 1 || 2:00 pm || ESPN+ || at Texas Tech ||  || Dan Law FieldLubbock, TX ||  ||  ||  ||  ||  ||  ||  || 
|- bgcolor=
| Apr 2 || 2:00 pm || ESPN+ || at Texas Tech ||  || Dan Law FieldLubbock, TX ||  ||  ||  ||  ||  ||  ||  || 
|- bgcolor=
| Apr 4 || 6:30 pm || ESPN+ || at Tarleton State* ||  || Cecil Ballow Baseball ComplexStephenville, TX ||  ||  ||  ||  ||  ||  || — || 
|- bgcolor=
| Apr 6 || 6:30 pm || ESPN+ || vs. Oklahoma State ||  || Lupton StadiumFort Worth, TX ||  ||  ||  ||  ||  ||  ||  || 
|- bgcolor=
| Apr 7 || 8:00 pm || ESPNU || vs. Oklahoma State ||  || Lupton StadiumFort Worth, TX ||  ||  ||  ||  ||  ||  ||  || 
|- bgcolor=
| Apr 8 || 4:00 pm || ESPN+ || vs. Oklahoma State ||  || Lupton StadiumFort Worth, TX ||  ||  ||  ||  ||  ||  ||  || 
|- bgcolor=
| Apr 11 || 6:30 pm || ESPN+ || at Abilene Christian* ||  || Crutcher Scott FieldAbilene, TX ||  ||  ||  ||  ||  ||  || — || 
|- bgcolor=
| Apr 14 || 5:00 pm || ESPN+ || vs. UNC Wilmington* ||  || Lupton StadiumFort Worth, TX ||  ||  ||  ||  ||  ||  || — || 
|- bgcolor=
| Apr 15 || 4:00 pm || ESPN+ || vs. UNC Wilmington* ||  || Lupton StadiumFort Worth, TX ||  ||  ||  ||  ||  ||  || — || 
|- bgcolor=
| Apr 16 || 1:00 pm || ESPN+ || vs. UNC Wilmington* ||  || Lupton StadiumFort Worth, TX ||  ||  ||  ||  ||  ||  || — || 
|- bgcolor=
| Apr 18 || 6:00 pm || ESPN+ || vs. Lamar* ||  || Lupton StadiumFort Worth, TX ||  ||  ||  ||  ||  ||  || — || 
|- bgcolor=
| Apr 21 || 5:30 pm ||  || at West Virginia ||  || Monongalia County BallparkGranville, WV ||  ||  ||  ||  ||  ||  ||  || 
|- bgcolor=
| Apr 22 || 3:00 pm ||  || at West Virginia ||  || Monongalia County BallparkGranville, WV ||  ||  ||  ||  ||  ||  ||  || 
|- bgcolor=
| Apr 23 || 12:00 pm ||  || at West Virginia ||  || Monongalia County BallparkGranville, WV ||  ||  ||  ||  ||  ||  ||  ||
|- bgcolor=
| Apr 25 || 6:00 pm || ESPN+ || vs. Dallas Baptist* ||  || Lupton StadiumFort Worth, TX ||  ||  ||  ||  ||  ||  || — || 
|- bgcolor=
| Apr 28 || 6:00 pm || ESPNU || vs. Texas ||  || Lupton StadiumFort Worth, TX ||  ||  ||  ||  ||  ||  ||  || 
|- bgcolor=
| Apr 29 || 6:00 pm || ESPNU || vs. Texas ||  || Lupton StadiumFort Worth, TX ||  ||  ||  ||  ||  ||  ||  || 
|- bgcolor=
| Apr 30 || 1:00 pm || ESPN+ || vs. Texas ||  || Lupton StadiumFort Worth, TX ||  ||  ||  ||  ||  ||  ||  || 
|-

|- bgcolor=
| May 2 || 6:00 pm || ESPN+ || vs. UT-Rio Grande Valley* ||  || Lupton StadiumFort Worth, TX ||  ||  ||  ||  ||  ||  || — || 
|- bgcolor=
| May 5 || 6:30 pm || ESPN+ || vs. Cal State Fullerton* ||  || Lupton StadiumFort Worth, TX ||  ||  ||  ||  ||  ||  || — || 
|- bgcolor=
| May 6 || 4:00 pm || ESPN+ || vs. Cal State Fullerton* ||  || Lupton StadiumFort Worth, TX ||  ||  ||  ||  ||  ||  || — || 
|- bgcolor=
| May 7 || 1:00 pm || ESPN+ || vs. Cal State Fullerton* ||  || Lupton StadiumFort Worth, TX ||  ||  ||  ||  ||  ||  || — ||
|- bgcolor=
| May 12 || 6:30 pm || ESPN+ || vs. Baylor ||  || Lupton StadiumFort Worth, TX ||  ||  ||  ||  ||  ||  ||  || 
|- bgcolor=
| May 13 || 4:00 pm || ESPN+ || vs. Baylor ||  || Lupton StadiumFort Worth, TX ||  ||  ||  ||  ||  ||  ||  || 
|- bgcolor=
| May 14 || 1:00 pm || ESPN+ || vs. Baylor ||  || Lupton StadiumFort Worth, TX ||  ||  ||  ||  ||  ||  ||  || 
|- bgcolor=
| May 16 || 6:00 pm || ESPN+ || vs. Texas State* ||  || Lupton StadiumFort Worth, TX ||  ||  ||  ||  ||  ||  || — ||
|- bgcolor=
| May 18 || 6:00 pm || ESPN+ || at Kansas State ||  || Tointon Family StadiumManhattan, KS ||  ||  ||  ||  ||  ||  ||  || 
|- bgcolor=
| May 19 || 6:00 pm || ESPN+ || at Kansas State ||  || Tointon Family StadiumManhattan, KS ||  ||  ||  ||  ||  ||  ||  || 
|- bgcolor=
| May 20 || 4:00 pm || ESPN+ || at Kansas State ||  || Tointon Family StadiumManhattan, KS ||  ||  ||  ||  ||  ||  ||  || 
|- 

|- 
| Legend:       = Win       = Loss       = Canceled      Bold = TCU team member
|-
|"*" indicates a non-conference game."#" represents ranking. All rankings from D1Baseball on the date of the contest."()" represents postseason seeding in the Big 12 Tournament or NCAA Regional, respectively.

Rankings

References

TCU Horned Frogs
TCU Horned Frogs baseball seasons